The Rich Man's Daughter is a 2015 Philippine television drama romantic series broadcast by GMA Network. It premiered on the network's Telebabad line up and worldwide via GMA Pinoy TV from May 11, 2015 to August 7, 2015, replacing Second Chances.

Mega Manila ratings are provided by AGB Nielsen Philippines.

Series overview

Episodes

May 2015

June 2015

July 2015

August 2015

References

Lists of Philippine drama television series episodes